The Church of Saint Clare or Klara Church is a church in central Stockholm. Since 1989, the Swedish Evangelical Mission is responsible for its activities.

The Church of Saint Clare is located on Klara Västra Kyrkogata in the Klara area in lower Norrmalm. The Klara area (also known in Swedish as Klarakvarteren) takes its name from the church. This name has become synonymous with the old city that once occupied lower Norrmalm.

History

The Convent and Church of St. Clare was founded on the site in 1280s. In 1527, Gustav Vasa, King of Sweden, had the church and convent torn down. Construction of the current church started in 1572 under Johan III.

The graveyard which is almost surrounded now by modern buildings was started in the 17th century.

See also
History of Stockholm

References

External links

Cemeteries in Sweden
Churches in Stockholm
Churches in the Diocese of Stockholm (Church of Sweden)
Churches converted from the Roman Catholic Church to the Church of Sweden
Swedish Evangelical Mission church buildings